Mangelia hooveri is an extinct species of sea snail, a marine gastropod mollusk in the family Mangeliidae.

Description
The length of the shell attains 12 mm, its diameter 4.2 mm.

(Original description) The small shell has an elongate-fusiform shape. The spire is elevated with a rounded apex  It contains seven whorls, evenly convex, with about eleven slightly transverse, rounded ribs, which become obsolete at the sutures. The spiral sculpture is obsolete. The aperture is narrow, elliptical, narrowing anteriorly to siphonal canal. This siphonal canalis  truncate in front. The posterior sinus is small. The outer lip is arcuate, thin, with a faint ridge on the interior. The suture is deeply impressed. The columella is long, smooth within, obsolete sculpture without. .

Distribution
This extinct marine species was found in Pleistocene strata off San Pedro to San Diego, California, USA.

References

External links
 Worldwide Mollusc Species Data Base : Mangelia painei

painei
Gastropods described in 1903